Michael or Mike Bailey may refer to:
Michael Buckworth Bailey (1827–1899), early Anglican missionary to Japan
Michael Bailey (environmentalist) (born 1954), early member of Greenpeace Foundation
Michael Bailey (businessman) (born 1948), former CEO of Compass Group
Michael Bailey (Canadian football) (born 1982), Toronto Argonauts player
Michael Bailey (swimmer) (born 1948), British Olympic swimmer
Mike Bailey (actor) (born 1988), English actor
Mike Bailey (footballer) (born 1942), English footballer
Mike Bailey (weatherman), (c. 1950–2021) Australian radio presenter and politician
Mike Bailey (wrestler) (born 1990), Canadian professional wrestler 
J. Michael Bailey (born 1957), American psychologist, researcher of sexual orientation
Michael Bailey (cricketer) (born 1954), retired English cricketer
Michael G. Bailey, American attorney from Arizona
Michael Bailey (Coronation Street), a fictional character from British soap opera Coronation Street